Ghafour Jahani (born 19 June 1951 in Bandar Anzali, Iran) is an Iranian football coach and former player.

He mostly played for Malavan. He was one of the key players of Malavan reaching the third place in the Iranian Takht Jamshid in 1978. 1974 and 1977 he was the second best scorer of the Iranian league. He also won the Iranian Cup – Hazfi Cup – in 1976.

Jahani, who was capped 30 times for the national team between 1974 and 1978, was a member of the Iranian team winning the football tournament of the Asian Games in Tehran in 1974 as well as participating in 1976 Olympics in Montreal, when Iran reached the quarterfinalsthe Asian Cup 1976 in Tehran. He also played two games for Iran in the 1978 World Cup.

Jahani scored 4 goals during the 1978 world cup qualifications' campaign, one of them was the winning goal against Australia in Tehran which qualified Iran for the 1978 World Cup in Argentina.

References

1951 births
Living people
1978 FIFA World Cup players
Iran international footballers
Iranian football managers
Iranian footballers
Malavan players
Olympic footballers of Iran
Footballers at the 1976 Summer Olympics
Asian Games gold medalists for Iran
Sportspeople from Gilan province
Association football forwards
Asian Games medalists in football
Footballers at the 1974 Asian Games
Medalists at the 1974 Asian Games
20th-century Iranian people